Sardor Mirzaev (Uzbek Cyrillic: Сардор Мирзаев; born 21 March 1991) is an Uzbek professional association footballer who plays as an attacking midfielder for Muangthong United in the Thai League 1.

Career
Mirzayev played for Neftchi FK for 4 years, until transferring to Lokomotiv Tashkent FK, where he was promptly loaned out to Neftchi FK for a further season. On his return to Lokomotiv Tashkent, he scored his first AFC Champions League goal in Tashkent's 3–1 away loss to Saudi Arabian club Al-Hilal FC.

On 11 December 2020, it was confirmed that Mirzayev would join the Thai league club Muangthong United for the 2020 season.

International career
Mirzayev has represented Uzbekistan at U-20s, U-21s, and U-23s ages. He was selected to play for the Uzbekistan U-20s during the 2009 FIFA U-20 World Cup in Egypt. This saw Uzbekistan finish third in their group behind Ghana and Uruguay.  however finished above England on goal difference.

He was also selected in the U23s to participate in the 2013 AFC U-22 Championship in which Uzbekistan finish 3rd in the group, and failed to reach the knock out stages.
Mirzayev made official debut for national team on 29 March 2015 in friendly against South Korea when he was called up for the first time in national team.

References

External links
 
 

1991 births
Living people
Uzbekistani footballers
Uzbekistan international footballers
PFC Lokomotiv Tashkent players
Association football midfielders
Footballers at the 2010 Asian Games
Uzbekistan Super League players
Asian Games competitors for Uzbekistan